Pravesh Rana (born 26 February 1983) is an Indian actor, television host and model. He has walked the ramp for various top designers and also won the title of Mr. India in 2008. He was a participant in the reality television show Bigg Boss (2009) and has hosted several seasons of the reality show Emotional Atyachar and award functions like Screen Awards, Indian Television Awards and the Golden Petal Awards. He made his Bollywood debut with the film Saheb, Biwi Aur Gangster Returns (2013), for which he was nominated for an Apsara Awards in the category of Best Male Debut in 2014.

He later on appeared in Navneet Behal directorial  San' 75 Pachattar (2016) and Kanwal Sethi directed London Confidential (2020), it was released on Zee5. He was seen playing the role of Thapa in Netflix original series The Serpent (2021). He also made a small appearance as Heeralal in Radhe (2021). He also played the main antagonist, Project Manager Bali in Ram Setu.

Education
He completed his schooling from St. Mary's Academy, Meerut, after which he moved to Ramjas College, Delhi University to complete B. A. (Honors) in Economics. He completed his Master of Fine Art (MFA) from London Academy of Music and Dramatic Art.

Career
He won the Haywards 5000 Mr India contest in 2008 in Mumbai. Rana has worked for television channels like Zoom, STAR Plus, The Walt Disney Company and Colors (Viacom 18) and hosted various seasons of Emotional Atyachar. Rana was the runner-up in Bigg Boss Season 3. He was recently seen in BBC ONE's The Serpent (TV series).

Filmography

Awards and nominations

References

External links
 

Living people
People from Baraut
Indian male models
1993 births
Male actors in Hindi cinema
Indian television presenters
Bigg Boss (Hindi TV series) contestants
Alumni of the London Academy of Music and Dramatic Art
Ramjas College alumni